Lovers Rock is a 2020 romance film directed by Steve McQueen and co-written by McQueen and Courttia Newland. It stars Micheal Ward and Amarah-Jae St. Aubyn as two lovers who meet at a reggae house party in 1980 in West London. The film was released as part of the anthology series Small Axe on BBC One on 22 November 2020 and Amazon Prime Video on 27 November 2020. It premiered as an opening film at the 58th New York Film Festival on 24 September 2020.

Plot

Cast 

 Micheal Ward as Franklyn Cooper
 Amarah-Jae St. Aubyn as Martha Trenton
 Kedar Williams-Stirling as Clifton
 Shaniqua Okwok as Patty
 Ellis George as Cynthia
 Francis Lovehall as Reggie
 Daniel Francis-Swaby as Bammy
 Alexander James-Blake	as Parker B
 Kadeem Ramsay	as Samson
 Romario Simpson as Lizard
 Jermaine Freeman as Skinner
 Marcus Fraser	as Jabba
 Saffron Coomber as Grace
 Frankie Fox as Eddie Marks
 Dennis Bovell as Milton

Release 
The film was selected for the 2020 Cannes Film Festival alongside Mangrove, but the Festival was canceled due to the COVID-19 pandemic. The film later premiered at the 2020 New York Film Festival, which was held virtually, alongside Mangrove and Red, White and Blue. It screened at the 64th BFI London Film Festival on 18 October 2020. It premiered on BBC One and became available for streaming on BBC iPlayer in the United Kingdom on 15 November 2020, and became available for streaming on Amazon Prime Video in the United States on 20 November.

Themes 
"Lovers rock" was the name of a musical genre popular around the mid-1970s in London, but its influences were transatlantic, as were its reaches. The film is named after the genre and plays some of the most popular songs throughout the movie, such as "Silly Games" by Janet Kay. The genre, which coupled the heavy reggae basslines popular in Jamaican music and the soft-soul vocal harmonies originating in Chicago and Philadelphia's R&B scenes, forged unique spaces of freedom common in young Black people of the time whose families were immigrants. This musical influence across space and between diaspora communities represented what Paul Gilroy theorized as the "Black Atlantic", a culture that exists outside of nation-state boundaries.

Critical response 
Review aggregator Metacritic assigned the film a weighted average score of 95 out of 100, based on 27 critics, indicating "universal acclaim." On Rotten Tomatoes the film holds an approval rating of 98% based on 103 reviews, with an average rating of 8.79/10. The site's critics consensus reads, "A singular viewing experience that perfectly captures a moment in time, Lovers Rock is a lovingly-crafted ode to Black joy." The entire Small Axe anthology was nominated for Best Miniseries or Television Film at the 78th Golden Globe Awards.

Angelica Bastin of Vulture.com called Lovers Rock "undoubtedly one of the best movies of the year...a transfixing romance not just between the two characters at its center but one about the beauty of the human body, the succor of an energetic party, and the possibility in the hush of a night."

The film appeared on several critics' top ten lists of best films from 2020.

References

External links
 
 
 

2020 films
2020 romantic drama films
Amazon Studios films
American romantic drama films
BBC Film films
British romantic drama films
Films directed by Steve McQueen
Films set in 1980
Films set in London
2020s English-language films
2020s American films
2020s British films